Madurai Shanmukhavadivu Subbulakshmi (16 September 1916 – 11 December 2004) was an Indian Carnatic singer from Madurai, Tamil Nadu. She was the first musician ever to be awarded the Bharat Ratna, India's highest civilian honour. She is the first Indian musician to receive the Ramon Magsaysay award in 1974 with the citation reading "Exacting purists acknowledge Srimati M. S. Subbulakshmi as the leading exponent of classical and semi-classical songs in the carnatic tradition of South India. She was the First Indian who performed in United Nations General Assembly in 1966."

Biography

Early years 
Subbulakshmi (Kunjamma to her family) was born on 16 September 1916 in Madurai, Madras Presidency, to veena player Shanmukavadiver Ammal and Subramania Iyer. Her grandmother Akkammal was a violinist.

She started learning Carnatic music at an early age and trained in Carnatic music under the tutelage of Semmangudi Srinivasa Iyer and subsequently in Hindustani music under Pandit Narayanrao Vyas.

Her mother, from the devadasi community, was a music exponent and a regular stage performer, and Subbulakshmi grew up in an environment very conducive to musical learning. Her musical interests were also shaped by regular interactions with Karaikudi Sambasiva Iyer, Mazhavarayanendal Subbarama Bhagavathar and Ariyakudi Ramanuja Iyengar.

Subbulakshmi gave her first public performance, at the age of eleven, in the year 1927, in the 100 pillar hall inside the Rockfort Temple, Tiruchirappalli; with Mysore Chowdiah on the violin and Dakshinamurthy Pillai on the mridangam. This was organised by the Tiruchirappalli-based Indian National Congress leader F. G. Natesa Iyer.

Move to Madras 
In 1936 Subbulakshmi moved to Madras (now Chennai). She also made her film debut in Sevasadan in 1938. Her debut to the world of cinema was again opposite F. G. Natesa Iyer.

Musical style and performance

Singing career 

M.S. Subbulakshmi began her Carnatic classical music training under her mother Shanmukhavadivu; and later in Hindustani classical training under Pandit Narayan Rao Vyas. Subbulakshmi first recording was released when she was 10 years old.

Subbulakshmi gave her first performance at the prestigious Madras Music Academy in 1929, when she was 13 years old . The performance consisted of singing bhajans (Hindu hymns). The academy was known for its discriminating selection process, and they broke tradition by inviting a young girl as a key performer. Her performance was described as spellbinding and earned her many admirers and the moniker of musical genius from critics. Soon after her debut performances, Subbulakshmi became one of the leading Carnatic vocalists.

By the age of seventeen, Subbulakshmi was giving concerts on her own, including major performances at the Madras Music Academy.

She travelled to London, New York, Canada, the Far East, and other places as India's cultural ambassador. Her concerts at Edinburgh International Festival of Music and Drama in 1963; Carnegie Hall, New York; the UN General Assembly on UN day in 1966; Royal Albert Hall, London in 1982; and Festival of India in Moscow in 1987
were significant landmarks in her career.

In 1969 she was accompanied by Indian Railways Advisor SN Venkata Rao to Rameswaram, where she sang several songs in front of each idol in the Ramanathaswamy Temple. She shared a very cordial relation with Sree Ramaseva Mandali Bengaluru for whom she performed 36 concerts.

After the death of her husband Kalki Sadasivam in 1997, she stopped all her public performances. Her last performance was in 1997, before her retirement from public concerts.

M. S. Subbulakshmi died on 11 December 2004, at her home in Kotturpuram, Chennai.

Films 
M.S. also acted in a few Tamil films in her youth. Her first movie, Sevasadanam, was released on 2 May 1938. F.G. Natesa Iyer was the lead actor, opposite Subbulakshmi, in this film, directed by K. Subramanyam. It was a critical and commercial success. Ananda Vikatan favourably reviewed the film on 8 May 1938:

Sevasadanam is one of the early Tamil films to be set in a contemporary social setting and to advocate reformist social policies.
The film is an adapted version of Premchand's novel Bazaar-e-Husn.
The veteran Marxist leader N. Sankaraiah, has described Sevasadanam as an "unusual film" for choosing the subject of marriages between young girls and old men (which had social sanction). According to him, the film successfully broughtout the "sufferings of the girl" (acted by M.S.) and the "mental agony of the aged husband".(acted by F.G.Natesa Iyer).Tamil film critic and historian Aranthai Narayanan observes in his bookThamizh Cinemavin Kathai (The Story of Tamil Cinema) that "Seva Sadhanam proved a turning point in the history of Tamil cinema. In the climax, the aged husband, now a totally changed man, was shown as casting aside with utter contempt his 'sacred thread', which symbolises his Brahmin superiority. It came as a stunning blow to the then Brahmin orthodoxy."

MS Subbulakshmi also played the male role of Narada in Savitri (1941) to raise money for launching Kalki, her husband's nationalist Tamil weekly. Her title role of the Rajasthani saint-poetess Meera in the eponymous 1945 film gave her national prominence. This movie was re-made in Hindi in 1947.

Awards and honours 

Pandit Jawaharlal Nehru had this to say about M.S. Subbulakshmi- "Who am I, a mere Prime Minister before a Queen, a Queen of Music". While Lata Mangeshkar called her Tapaswini (the Renunciate), Ustad Bade Ghulam Ali Khan termed her Suswaralakshmi (the goddess of the perfect note), and Kishori Amonkar labelled her the ultimate eighth note or Aathuvaan Sur, which is above the seven notes basic to all music. The great national leader and poet Sarojini Naidu called her "Nightingale of India". Her many famous renditions of bhajans include the chanting of Meenakshi Pancharatnam, Bhaja Govindam, Vishnu sahasranama (1000 names of Vishnu), Hari Tuma Haro and the Venkateswara Suprabhatam (musical hymns to awaken Lord Balaji early in the morning).

She was widely honoured, praised and awarded. Some of the popular ones include:
 Padma Bhushan in 1954
 Sangeet Natak Akademi Award in 1956
 Sangeetha Kalanidhi in 1968
 Ramon Magsaysay award (often considered Asia's Nobel Prize) in 1974
 Padma Vibhushan in 1975
 Sangeetha Kalasikhamani in 1975 by The Indian Fine Arts Society, Chennai
 Kalidas Samman in 1988
 Indira Gandhi Award for National Integration in 1990
 Bharat Ratna in 1998

She was honoured as a resident artist Asthana Vidhwan of Tirumala Tirupati Devasthanams. Tirupati Urban Development Authority (TUDA) has installed a bronze statue of M.S. Subbulakshmi at the Poornakumbham circle in the temple town. It was unveiled by Andhra Pradesh Chief Minister Y. S. Rajasekhara Reddy on 28 May 2006.

The Kancheepuram Saree shade known as MS Blue was named after her by the well known Congress party member and philanthropist, Sri Muthu Chettiyar when they met at the residence of Sri R. Aiyadurai and Smt. Thangam Aiyadurai at Lady Desikachari Road, Madras, who were close friends of MS and Sadasivam.

A commemorative postage stamp on her was issued on 18-December-2005.
United Nations decided to issue stamp to mark  birth centenary M.S. Subbulakshmi,
She was bestowed with enormous prize moneys with these awards, most of which she donated to charity. She has given more than 200 charity concerts and raised well over Rs. 10,000,000. She was awarded honorary degrees from several Universities. She was an ardent devotee of Kanchi Mahaswamigal and she rendered his composition "Maithreem Bhajatha" (O World! Cultivate peace) in her concert at the UN in 1966. She made a 20-minute recording of "Venkatesa Suprabhatam" for HMV, the royalty from which goes to the Veda Patasala run by the Tirupati Tirumala Devasthanam. She donated many of the royalties on several best sold records to many charity organisations.

References

Further reading 
 M.S. Subbulaksmi, the Voice Divine (79 pages) by V. Gangadhar.
 MS – A Life in Music, T. J. S. George. 2004, HarperCollins. 
 
 MS & Radha – Saga of Steadfast Devotion – by Gowri Ramnarayan – http://www.msstribute.org/
 Of Gifted Voice, The Life and Art of M.S. Subbulakshmi Keshav Desiraju Harper Collins.

External links 

 
 Biography at the official site of Ramon Magsaysay award
 
 Photo of MS, Sadhasivam and Ellis R. Dungan
 M.S. Subbulakshmi: Portraits of a diva  – The Hindu

1916 births
2004 deaths
Women Carnatic singers
Carnatic singers
Tamil singers
20th-century Indian actresses
Tamil actresses
Recipients of the Bharat Ratna
Recipients of the Padma Vibhushan in arts
Recipients of the Padma Bhushan in arts
Recipients of the Sangeet Natak Akademi Award
Ramon Magsaysay Award winners
Indian women classical singers
Actresses in Tamil cinema
Musicians from Madurai
Sanskrit-language singers
Sangeetha Kalanidhi recipients
20th-century Indian singers
Singers from Tamil Nadu
Actresses from Madurai
20th-century Indian women singers
Women musicians from Tamil Nadu
Recipients of the Sangeet Natak Akademi Fellowship